William Mutchler (December 21, 1831 – June 23, 1893) was a Democratic member of the U.S. House of Representatives from Pennsylvania.

Biography
William Mutchler (father of Howard Mutchler) was born in Palmer Township, Pennsylvania. He attended public schools and Vandeveer’s Academy in Easton, Pennsylvania. He studied law, was admitted to the bar, and commenced practice at Easton. He served as sheriff of Northampton County, Pennsylvania, from 1854 to 1860, and as prothonotary of Northampton County from 1861 to 1867.  He was adjutant of the Thirty-eighth Pennsylvania Volunteers in 1863.  He was appointed assessor of internal revenue in March 1867 and served until May 1869.  He was chairman of the Democratic State committee of Pennsylvania in 1869 and 1870, and a delegate to the Democratic National Conventions from 1876 until his death.

Mutchler was elected as a Democrat to the Forty-fourth Congress, where he served as chairman of the United States House Committee on Expenditures in the Department of the Interior. He was not a candidate for reelection in 1876. He was again elected to the Forty-seventh and Forty-eighth Congresses.  He was not a candidate for reelection in 1884.  He was again elected to the Fifty-first, Fifty-second, and Fifty-third Congresses, and served until his death in Easton. He was interred in Easton Cemetery.

See also
List of United States Congress members who died in office (1790–1899)

References
 Retrieved on 2008-02-14
William Mutchler at The Political Graveyard

External links
 

1831 births
1893 deaths
19th-century American lawyers
19th-century American politicians
Democratic Party members of the United States House of Representatives from Pennsylvania
Pennsylvania lawyers
Pennsylvania prothonotaries
Pennsylvania sheriffs
People of Pennsylvania in the American Civil War
Politicians from Northampton County, Pennsylvania
Union Army soldiers